Nebeker is a surname. It may refer to:

Aquila Nebeker (1859–1933), American politician, president of the Utah Senate
Chase Nebeker Peterson (1929–2014), American MD, president of the University of Utah from 1983 to 1991
Frank Q. Nebeker, judge of the United States Court of Appeals for Veterans Claims
Royal Nebeker (1945–2014), American painter and print maker